Ganeshpur is a village and market in Pachperwa block in Balrampur district, Uttar Pradesh state of India.

References 

Villages in Balrampur district, Uttar Pradesh